Jewish Communist Party may refer to:

Jewish Communist Party — Poalei Zion, section of the Palestine Communist Party founded in Palestine 1919
Jewish Communist Party (Poalei Zion) founded in Soviet Russia in 1919
Jewish Communist Labour Party (Poalei Zion) founded in the Russian Empire in 1906
Jewish Communist Party of Austria founded in 1919
Jewish Communist Union (Poalei Zion) (the Komverband) an international federation of parties founded in 1921

See also
Yevsektsiya - the Jewish Section of the Communist Party of the Soviet Union.
 Hebrew Communists